Emerald Lake may refer to:

 Emerald Lake (British Columbia), Canada
 Emerald Lake (Yukon), Canada
 Emerald Lake (Saskatchewan), Canada
 Emerald Lake (Ooty), India

United States

California
 Emerald Lake (Lassen Peak), a lake in Shasta County near Lassen Peak
 Emerald Lake (Trinity County, California), a lake in the Trinity Alps of Trinity County
 Emerald Lake Hills, California, a census-designated place in San Mateo County
 Emerald Lake (Mono County, California), a lake near Mammoth Lakes, California

Montana
 Emerald Lake in Deer Lodge County, Montana
 Emerald Lake in Gallatin County, Montana
 Emerald Lake in Pondera County, Montana
 Emerald Lake in Silver Bow County, Montana
 Emerald Lake in Stillwater County, Montana
 Emerald Lake in Sweet Grass County, Montana

Other states
 Emerald Lake (Rocky Mountain National Park), a lake near Hallett Peak in Rocky Mountain National Park
 Emerald Lake (San Juan National Forest), a lake in the Weminuche Wilderness
 Emerald Lake (Idaho)
 Emerald Lake in Elko County, Nevada
 Emerald Lake Village, in Hillsborough, New Hampshire
 Emerald Lake (Mount Timpanogos Wilderness) a lake in Utah County, Utah
 Emerald Lake State Park, Vermont

See also
 Lake Emerald (disambiguation)
 Lake Treganowan in Emerald, Victoria, Australia
 Emeraude Lake, Quebec, Canada
 Emerald Lakes, Pennsylvania